Johnkutty is an Indian film editor working in Malayalam film industry. He began his career editing television shows in 2000, debuting with Munshi in Asianet. He joined in the Kerala State Film Development Corporation in 2001 as a non-linear editor. After working as an assist in a number of Malayalam films, he debuted as an independent editor in 2012 with the film Mayamohini.

Career
He started his career editing in 2000 by Munshi in Asianet. In the following year, he joined in the Kerala State Film Development Corporation as a non-linear editor. Later he edited a number of Malayalam television serials, notable of it includes Sumangali and Jagapoga. He has also edited few documentary films for Kerala Public Relations Department. He edited 13 episodes of Tenali Raman produced by Toons Animation for the American channel Cartoon Network.

After three years, he joined in Chitranjali Studio, Thiruvananthapuram. During that period he got an opportunity to work as associate editor. Since then he joined in a devotional channel in the editorial section as head of the department (HOD) and worked for some of the films. After three years, he began to work in films as Spot Editor as well as associate editor. Prior to that and during this period he worked as an assistant editor in the films Achuvinte Amma, Makalkku, Photographer, Ore Kadal, Rithu, Madampi, Pokkiri Raja, Kaaryasthan, Seniors, Traffic. His first film as an independent editor was Mayamohini in 2012.  He is currently working on the film Vaathil.

Filmography

Awards

References

External links
 
 

Film editors from Kerala
Living people
Malayalam film editors
Year of birth missing (living people)